Mehmed Sadık Pasha (1826 – 1901) was an Ottoman conservative statesman and a member of the Senate. He was Grand Vizier of the Ottoman Empire from 18 April 1878 until 28 May 1878. He also served as governor of the Aidin Vilayet of the Ottoman Empire.

References 

1825 births
1901 deaths
19th-century Grand Viziers of the Ottoman Empire
Ottoman governors of Aidin